Mahmoud Alam (born in British India) is a former tennis player from Pakistan, who represented the country in the Davis Cup and also played at Wimbledon.

Wimbledon
He is the first Pakistani to reach the second round in 1948 at Wimbledon during the pre-open era. He was one of two Pakistanis at the tournament.

Scores
 1st round: defeated Bela Peto of Hungary, 6–3, 5–7, 6–4, 6–3.
 2nd round: lost to Egyptian Marcel Coen 7–9 4–6, 7–5, 3–6.

Davis Cup
Alam represented Pakistan in 2 ties in 1948 against Switzerland and in 1950 against Philippines. He overall record was 0–6.

 Singles: 0–4
 Doubles: 0–2

Background and family life
His father, Mehboob Alam, was a captain of Aligarh's hockey team from 1914 - 1918. His daughter, Sheherezade Alam is a celebrated ceramist and son-in-law, Zahoor ul Akhlaq was a painter. He also has two sons, Asad and Shaban.

References

External links

Pakistani male tennis players
Year of birth missing (living people)
Living people